(born August 20, 1940) is a Japanese sprint canoer who competed in the late 1960s. He was eliminated in the semifinals of the C-2 1000 metre event at the 1968 Summer Olympics in Mexico City.

External links
Sports-reference.com profile

1940 births
Canoeists at the 1968 Summer Olympics
Japanese male canoeists
Living people
Olympic canoeists of Japan